Ding Xuan is a Chinese professional association football player plays as a goalkeeper for Shanghai Shengli. She is in the 2020 Summer Olympics.

References

Living people
Chinese women's footballers
China women's international footballers
Footballers at the 2020 Summer Olympics
Olympic footballers of China
Women's association football goalkeepers
1989 births